The 2009 election for Mayor of New York City took place on Tuesday, November 3. The incumbent Mayor, Michael Bloomberg, an independent who left the Republican Party in 2008, won reelection on the Republican and Independence Party/Jobs & Education lines with 50.7% of the vote over the retiring City Comptroller, Bill Thompson, a Democrat (also endorsed by the Working Families Party), who won 46.3%. Thompson had won the Democratic primary election on September 15 with 71% of the vote over City Councilman Tony Avella and Roland Rogers. This was the fifth straight mayoral victory by Republican candidates in New York despite the city's strongly Democratic leaning in national and state elections.

Six other parties' candidates also contested the general election in November. Stephen Christopher of the Conservative Party of New York won 1.6% of the votes, more than the combined total of all the other minor candidates. The turnout of voters—fewer than 350,000 in September and fewer than 1.2 million in November—was relatively low for recent mayoral elections, and Bloomberg won with fewer votes than any successful mayoral candidate had received since women joined the city's electorate in 1917.

Prior to the election, the New York City Council had voted to extend the city's term limits, permitting Bloomberg (previously elected in 2001 and 2005) and other second-term officeholders such as Thompson to run for a third term. Attempts to put this decision to a popular referendum, to reverse it in the federal courts or to override it with state legislation were unsuccessful.

As of 2021, this is the last mayoral election in which a candidate on the Republican ballot line carried Manhattan or Queens.

Background

New York City elected its Mayor by popular vote when Greater New York was formed in 1897, then in 1901, 1903, 1905 and every four years thereafter, as well as in the special elections of 1930 and 1950.

Nineteen of the 31 mayoral elections held between 1897 and 2005 were won by the official candidate of the Democratic Party, eight by the Republican Party's nominee, and four by others. (The last official Democratic candidate to win the mayoralty was David Dinkins in the election of 1989; the last candidate to win the mayoralty without winning either the Republican or the Democratic primary was Mayor John V. Lindsay, running for re-election on the Liberal column in 1969.)

Michael Bloomberg, formerly a Democrat, was elected as a Republican in 2001 and 2005, succeeding another Republican mayor, Rudy Giuliani, elected in 1993 and 1997. Bloomberg left the Republican Party in 2008 and became a political independent.

By a hotly contested vote of 29–22 on October 23, 2008, the New York City Council extended the former two-term limit for Mayor, Council and other elected city offices to three terms, allowing Mayor Bloomberg to pursue his announced intention of seeking a third term in 2009. Legal challenges to the extension failed in Federal court, and a proposed law in the New York State Legislature to override the extension was not passed.

Bloomberg's most prominent opponent was Bill Thompson, who could (similarly) have run for a third term as New York City Comptroller in 2009, but instead sought and won the Democratic nomination for Mayor.

General election candidates

Democratic Party

Bill Thompson, New York City Comptroller from January 2002 to December 2009. Bill Thompson was also the candidate of the Working Families Party.

Working Families Party 
The Working Families Party's candidate for mayor was the City Comptroller and Democratic nominee, Bill Thompson

Republican Party 

Although changing his party affiliation from Republican to Independent in 2007, Bloomberg decided to run again as a Republican and was uncontested in the primary.

Independence Party 
Incumbent Mayor Michael Bloomberg, a political independent who was the endorsed Independence Party candidate, as well as the successful Republican primary nominee and an unsuccessful seeker of the Working Families Party nomination. Since he belonged to no political party, Bloomberg used the nominal label of "independent–Jobs & Education", which was merged with the Independence Party's line on the general election ballot to read "Independence/Jobs & Education".

Conservative Party 
 Stephen Christopher, a pastor at Memorial Baptist Church in Park Slope, Brooklyn, was unopposed for the nomination of the Conservative Party of New York.

Green Party 
Reverend Billy Talen – announced his mayoral candidacy under the Green Party banner in Union Square on March 1, 2009.

Libertarian Party 
 Joseph Dobrian – 2005 Libertarian candidate for Manhattan Borough President, journalist and TV talk show host.

New Voice Party
 Tyrrell Eiland, an architect by training who builds green charter schools and founded the New Voice Party. Eiland also sought the nomination of the Independence Party.

Party for Socialism and Liberation 
 Frances Villar – mother, student at Lehman College, activist on domestic and international issues.

Rent Is 2 Damn High
 Jimmy McMillan – war veteran and party candidate for Mayor in 2005, when he won 4,111 votes (0.3% of the total); also registered for the 2009 Democratic mayoral primary ballot.

Socialist Workers Party 
 Dan Fein – 2005 candidate for New York City Comptroller.

Independents (no affiliation)
 Jonny Porkpie, the "Burlesque Mayor of NYC". Announced his candidacy on August 3, 2009,  targeting "The Naked Cowboy" as his main opponent.
John M. Finan, Chief Executive Officer, New York City Consulting Group LLC, and a candidate for the  Libertarian Party's 2008 nomination for U.S. President.

Candidates who were unsuccessful, withdrew or declined to run

Democratic Party
Tony Avella, current City Council-member representing District 19 in Queens
Jimmy McMillan, also the candidate of the Rent Is Too Damn High Party in both 2005 and 2009. McMillan received 23 write-in votes in the 2009 Democratic mayoral primary.
Roland Rogers
Anthony Weiner, U.S. Representative, had announced that he was a candidate for mayor, but withdrew his candidacy on May 28, 2009, and endorsed Bill Thompson.

Republican Party
Bruce Blakeman, attorney and Port Authority of New York and New Jersey Board Member, dropped out and endorsed Michael Bloomberg
Richard Parsons, chairman of Citigroup, insisted he was never going to run and endorsed Michael Bloomberg

Independence Party
 Tyrrell L. Eiland, non-profit executive, green architectural designer, and author. Eiland then ran as the candidate of the New Voice Party.

Independents (no affiliation)
 Naked Cowboy, Robert Burck Announced his candidacy on July 22, 2009, and withdrew in early September, 2009

Primaries

Uncontested nominations
Bloomberg was unopposed for the Republican and Independence Party nominations (which he had also won in 2001 and 2005), Thompson was unopposed for the Working Families Party nomination, and Stephen Christopher was unopposed for the Conservative Party nomination.

Democratic primary

Campaign
City Comptroller Bill Thompson and Councilman Tony Avella held their first televised debate on Wednesday, August 26, at the New York Public Library. They both directed more fire at Mayor Bloomberg than at each other. "After eight years of a Republican mayor who is focused on developers and the wealthy, I think New Yorkers are looking for change," said Thompson, while Avella declared that the "arrogance of billionaire Mike Bloomberg to think he's so important that he can overturn the term limits law, I think, is disgraceful." Another debate was held on September 9.

Primary election results
Tuesday, September 15, 2009

From the Board of Elections in the City of New York, September 26, 2009

Tony Avella, member of the New York City Council, representing a district in Queens. Out of the nearly 400 write-in votes, almost half or 184 (representing about one Democratic voter in 2,000) were some form or spelling of Mayor Michael Bloomberg.

Endorsements and public reception
In the final weeks of the campaign, Mayor Bloomberg was endorsed "enthusiastically" by the New York Times, which – while acknowledging Bill Thompson as a "worthy opponent" – praised Bloomberg for handling city matters "astonishingly well". Most other local newspapers had preceded the Times in endorsing the mayor, but many did so tepidly, presaging the misgivings of The New Yorker. In a report filed days before the election, the magazine likened Bloomberg to Marcus Licinius Crassus:

Polling

Post-primary match-up

Pre-primary match-ups

Bloomberg vs. Thompson

Bloomberg vs. Avella

Bloomberg approval ratings
The first table shows Bloomberg's approval ratings since June 2009. The other table shows whether or not people want a new mayor.

General election results
Tuesday, November 3, 2009

See also 
2009 New York City Public Advocate election
2009 New York City Comptroller election
2013 New York City mayoral election
2005 New York City mayoral election
2001 New York City mayoral election
New York City mayoral elections

References

External links
2009 New York City Mayor General Election: William Thompson (D) vs Mayor Michael Bloomberg (i) chart of aggregated poll results from Pollster.com

2009
New York City mayoral
New York City mayoral
New York
Michael Bloomberg